Pyrausta sumptuosalis is a moth of the family Crambidae. It is found in Sichuan, China.

References

Moths described in 1927
sumptuosalis
Moths of Asia
Taxa named by Aristide Caradja